RCBC may refer to:

 Rizal Commercial Banking Corporation
 Royal Connaught Boat Club
 Robinson College Boat Club
 Rowan College at Burlington County